The 7th of Never is the third studio album by the American heavy metal band Chastain, released in 1987 through David T. Chastain's own record label Leviathan Records in the USA. In Europe the album was reissued by Massacre Records in 1995. The band members lived in different locations in the United States and recorded in different studios their parts, which were later mixed by Steve Fontano at Prairie Sun Studios in California.

Track listing
All songs by David T. Chastain, except "The Wicked Are Restless" by Chastain and Leather Leone

Side one
"We Must Carry On" – 3:37*
"Paradise" - 4:12
"It's Too Late for Yesterday"  - 4:49
"827" (instrumental) - 3:22
"The Wicked Are Restless" - 5:37

Side two
"The 7th of Never" - 4:51
"Take Me Back in Time" - 4:50
"Feel His Magic" - 5:05
"Forevermore" - 6:03

Some CD's have a shorter version of "We Must Carry On" that fades out and runs 3:26.

Personnel

Band members
Leather Leone - vocals
David T. Chastain - guitars, producer
Mike Skimmerhorn - bass
Ken Mary - drums

Production
Dale Smith – guitar and bass recording engineer
Terry Date – drums recording engineer
Steve Fontano - vocals recording engineer, mixing
George Horn – mastering at Fantasy Studios, Berkeley, California

References

1987 albums
Chastain (band) albums